Malabar Devaswom Board is a Statutory and Independent body created for the governing and management of 1300 temples in Kerala assigned to it. With the passing of Madras Regulation Act in the year 1817, temples were brought under the control of East India Company,a corporate organisation. The concept of temple included its premises and wealth. However, from 1925, temples were brought under government control with the passing of State Religious and Charitable Endowments Act. Under this Act, the state governments exercised power for the formation of Temple Development Boards for major temples with the members from local city.

History and Objective 

Malabar Devaswom Board manages around 1340 temples in Kerala. Till Pre-British era temple management was with local members of town. Temple was a place of many cultural activities and social development place wih rest houses,cow dwelling places,community halls etc. Temple Development Boards for many temples in India are created for the maintenance and governing of the affairs of temple. Post Independence temples were brought under the administration of State Governments with the formation of States Religious and Charitable Endowments Act.

Composition 

Temple Development Board includes Chairman,Vice Chairman and other members appointed by State Government.

Malabar Devaswom Board is headed by K Murali.

Roles and Responsibilities 

Roles and Responsibilities of Temple Development Board includes the following:

 Ensuring performance of rituals.
 Ensuring accounting of collections.
 Development and maintenance of temples in other towns.
 Ensuring security of the temple property.
 Ensuring welfare of pilgrims.
 Look after welfare of staff.
 Hygiene preparation of Prasad.
 Road Maintenance and drinking water supply in premises.

List of temples maintained by the Board 
Following is the list of temples maintained by the Board:

References

External links 
 Official Website

Hindu organisations based in India